Viper (real name Ophelia Sarkissian, formerly known as Madame Hydra) is a supervillain appearing in American comic books published by Marvel Comics. She is a foe of the Avengers and the X-Men.

Viper was featured in the 2013 film The Wolverine, played by Russian actress Svetlana Khodchenkova. A variation of the character was portrayed by Mallory Jansen in the fourth season of the Marvel Cinematic Universe television series Agents of S.H.I.E.L.D..

Publication history 

Viper was created by Jim Steranko and first appeared in Captain America #110 (February 1969).

Fictional character biography 
Ophelia Sarkissian was orphaned as a child in Hungary. Part of her face was scarred at one time, although it has since been healed. Among 12 other girls, Ophelia was taken in by HYDRA and raised by Kraken. For 22 years, Ophelia excelled and became Kraken's best student. She eventually rose through the ranks of HYDRA and frequently came into conflict with Captain America and the organization known as S.H.I.E.L.D. She first appeared as a leader of HYDRA under the codename Madame Hydra, and first fought and captured Captain America while trying to contaminate New York City's water supply. She captured Rick Jones to bait a trap for Captain America, and then subdued the Avengers with gas, planning to bury them alive, and battled Captain America again. However, she was apparently killed when Captain America and Rick Jones dodged missiles she fired at them and she was caught in their explosion. Some time later, it was revealed that the Space Phantom had exchanged places with her and her whereabouts at the time were undisclosed.

She eventually severed her ties with HYDRA. Madame Hydra helped Jordan Stryke, a supervillain codenamed Viper, escape custody in Virginia, only to proceed in assassinating him and usurping his alias and leadership of the group known as the Serpent Squad. As the new Viper, she kidnapped Roxxon president Hugh Jones, in order to put him in thrall of the Serpent Crown. She battled Nomad and Namor the Sub-Mariner. Viper was the founder and leader of the elite criminal underworld through sheer ruthlessness, treachery, and the cunning of her black heart.

Viper took over the S.H.I.E.L.D. Helicarrier, and planned to crash it into the Congress building. She employed Boomerang and the Silver Samurai as operatives, and battled Spider-Man, Black Widow, Shang-Chi, and Nick Fury. Viper later employed the Silver Samurai as her chief operative, and attempted to kidnap Michael Kramer, a man carrying a fatal experimental disease, in order to release it on America. The Viper battled the first Spider-Woman, and became convinced that she was Merriam Drew. Drew was the mother of Spider-Woman and was considered deceased since 1931. The issue revealed Merriam had become allied to Chthon and was granted longevity in return. The Viper revealed herself to have been a pawn of Chthon for 50 years, but saved Spider-Woman's life by defying Chthon. Viper, employing Constrictor as her chief operative, captured Spider-Woman, believing she was responsible for making her think they were related. It was revealed that Chthon had actually granted Viper false memories of mothering Jessica as part of a plan to place both women under his control. Viper captured Captain America, and planned to release her new bubonic plague. Whether Viper actually has extraordinary longevity was left uncertain.

Re-employing the Silver Samurai, Viper attempted to coerce Team America into stealing the Cavourite Crystal, and then battled the New Mutants. In one of her many terrorist acts, she would try to gain control of the snake-themed organization called the Serpent Society, with Slither, Copperhead, Puff Adder, Fer-De-Lance, and Black Racer as her operatives. The latter four operatives infiltrated the Serpent Society in an attempt to take it over. Viper dispatched Cobra, Boomslang, and Copperhead to poison Washington D.C.'s water supply with a snake mutagen. Viper terrorized the White House and the President, and battled Captain America. She attempted to assassinate the organization's former leader Sidewinder, but she was betrayed by Cobra and arrested by Captain America. Viper was later freed from prison by Tyrannus. She used a snake mutagen on drug addicts, and then battled the Punisher. She then turned against and battled Tyrannus.

Madame Hydra has also been in conflict with the X-Men. She first came into contact with them upon trying to assassinate Mariko Yashida on behalf of her ally and presumed lover Silver Samurai, and tried to poison the team while disguised as Mariko's unconscious maid. She nearly killed X-Men members Rogue and Storm on two separate occasions, with Storm being nearly killed by Viper during the invasion of Khan. She also faced the New Mutants and was considered responsible for the presumed demise of Karma (Karma was only wounded and was abducted by the Shadow King for his own reasons).

Madame Hydra is a professional terrorist and has her own organization. She has come into conflict with many superheroes and supervillains over the years. Her nihilism and tendency to spread death around her has made it hard for other villains to associate with her. Only the Red Skull has found it a charming tendency and pursued a relationship with her for a while. The relationship ended when the Skull found out Viper was using his resources to finance massacres with no apparent financial benefit for either of them.

For a time, Viper employed a team of doppelgängers (known as "Pit-Vipers") to impersonate her. However, acting on her own, Pit-Viper 12 became involved with the Punisher during an international crime conference in Las Vegas and later tipped off S.H.I.E.L.D. to the real Viper's attempt to steal Russian nuclear missiles in Moscow. For compromising her anonymity, the Viper personally killed her treacherous double.

Later she blackmailed Wolverine into marrying her as a means to secure her criminal empire in Madripoor. Although this was a marriage of convenience, she did request to consummate the arrangement. Some time later, her body was briefly inhabited by the spirit of Ogun, and Wolverine mortally wounded her as a means of driving the spirit from her dying body. In return for seeking medical attention to save her life, Wolverine demanded a divorce. It is later implied that she actually had feelings for Wolverine.

Viper was then a member of an incarnation of the Hellfire Club, working with Courtney Ross, briefly under the title "White Warrior Princess". She has also associated with the Hand and resumed her ties with the Silver Samurai. She has also retaken the name "Madame Hydra".

For a time, Viper was the dictator of the nation of Madripoor, using the nation's resources to support global terrorism via HYDRA. She was overthrown by new S.H.I.E.L.D. Director Tony Stark and Tyger Tiger, the latter of whom is now ruler of Madripoor.

During the Dark Reign storyline, Viper is seen leaving her lover, the Silver Samurai, to rejoin Baron von Strucker and the ruling council of HYDRA. It was revealed that she is no longer Madame Hydra, as she was replaced by Contessa Valentina Allegra de Fontaine, taking up the mantle of Madame Hydra, wearing an elaborate tentacle headdress and elaborate HYDRA robes.

Viper is kidnapped by the mysterious group Leviathan, who are determined to find out the location of a mysterious box that both she and Madame Hydra procured from the Yashidas. Madame Hydra arrived at the Leviathan headquarters and offered the box to its leader, much to Viper's dismay. Madame Hydra then shot Viper to death. However, when HYDRA arrived, the Hive resurrected her, giving her tentacles that stemmed from her head, and she renamed herself Madame Hydra.

Following the Fear Itself storyline, Madame Hydra joins up with H.A.M.M.E.R. after Norman Osborn escapes from the Raft and regains leadership. After the defeat of Osborn and the Dark Avengers, Madame Hydra uses the resources of the now-defunct H.A.M.M.E.R. to begin rebuilding HYDRA. She later tips off Spider-Woman and Hawkeye about a heist Mister Negative is planning on a S.H.I.E.L.D. warehouse. While the Avengers deal with Mister Negative, Madame Hydra attacks a different S.H.I.E.L.D. facility and steals several captive Skrulls left over from the Secret Invasion.

Madame Hydra later led an attack on Avengers Tower while the team is away. She and the rest of her forces are defeated by Angel and his younger self from earlier in the timestream.

In "Death of Wolverine", she was revealed by Nuke as the "Green Queen" and current leader of Madripoor who sent out a contract to capture Wolverine.

Viper is part of the HYDRA High Council that the new Madame Hydra is collecting to assist Steve Rogers, who had his history altered by the Red Skull's clone using Kobik's powers to be a HYDRA sleeper agent for years.

During the "Secret Empire" storyline, Viper attends the meeting of the HYDRA High Council and talks about the opening of two new detention facilities to double the amount of Inhumans held in indefinite custody. While doing business with some men, Viper is told by a HYDRA agent that they have apprehended Black Widow. This is part of a diversion so that the Champions can infiltrate a HYDRA base. When Viper figures out that Widow is planning to kill Hydra Supreme, Viper tries to persuade Widow to join up with her enterprise.

During the "Hunt for Wolverine" storyline, Viper is seen in Madripoor where she leads the Femme Fatales (consisting of Knockout, Bloodlust, Mindblast, Snake Whip, and Sapphire Styx) into ambushing Kitty Pryde, Domino, Jubilee, Psylocke, and Storm at the King's Impresario Restaurant. While Psylocke, Rogue, and Storm are defeated and taken prisoner by Madame Hydra and the Femme Fatales, Kitty Pryde escapes with Domino and Jubilee. Viper congratulates the Femme Fatales for their work as they now have Psylocke, Rogue, and Storm as their prisoners. Mindblast suggests that they put a bounty on the ones that escaped, stating that every gang member in Lowtown will be looking for them. Viper states that she will discuss with her client on where to proceed next and to deposit Rogue and Storm to the client as "special guests." As Viper gives the status report to a representative of her client, she mentions that Sapphire Styx is still draining off of Psylocke just like she did with Magneto. The representative tells Viper that Sapphire Styx tends to prefer the life force of the mutants and tells Viper to focus on delivering the package as all that they are serves the will of Soteira. As Snake Whip asks if they are going to ignore Sapphire Styx's vampiric appetite, Viper says that they have to obey the representative's orders and "let the @#$%& feed." Viper is contacted by a representative of Soteira who was displeased that the launch was delayed by a torrential rainstorm and suggest that they launch before sunrise. While reluctantly taking the representative's suggestion, Viper and Snake Whip check up on Sapphire Styx who knocks down Snake Whip and claims that Wolverine's Patch alias is present even though Sapphire is the only one who can see him. Viper calls Knockout and Mindblast away from the prisoners to help deal with Sapphire. After hearing that the launch site for the rocket bound for Soteira is under attack, Viper gives the orders to launch it now. After Sapphire Styx explodes, Viper maintains the higher ground while Snake Whip joins the fight. When the Femme Fatales are defeated, Viper flees as Magneto plans to pursue her in order to purge Madripoor of Viper's criminal empire.

In the pages of the Ravencroft miniseries, Viper is seen as a member of J.A.N.U.S.

Powers and abilities
Viper has no superhuman abilities but her strength, speed, reflexes, agility, dexterity, coordination, balance and endurance are on the order of an Olympic athlete. She is a great swordsman and even greater marksman with most long range weapons, and has extensive training in hand-to-hand combat. Viper occasionally employs poisoned weapons with snake-motifs, such as venomous darts or artificial fangs filled with poison. She utilizes experimental weaponry, including a ring that enables teleportation, and in X-Treme X-Men, she made use of razor-sharp claw attachments apparently built into her gloves. A brilliant strategist and tactician with extensive combat tactical experience, Viper is highly skilled in the management of criminal organizations and very well connected in the international criminal underworld. She is also a master of stealth and espionage. Perhaps her greatest strengths are her influence, the financial resources at her disposal due to her stature in organized crime, and an uncanny luck which has allowed her to cheat death in situations where lesser people would have died. Viper may or may not have supernaturally augmented longevity.

Viper is usually armed with various ray pistols and conventional handguns. She has also used various other special weaponry, including poison-tipped throwing darts, knives, and whips. She has sharpened and elongated canine teeth with hollows inside them. She keeps a special poison in them, to which she has an immunity.

Reception

Accolades 

 In 2019, IGN ranked Viper 21st in their "Top 25 Marvel Villains" list.
 In 2020, CBR.com ranked Viper 2nd in their "10 Most Powerful Crime Bosses In Marvel Comics" list, 2nd in their "Marvel: The Council Of Hydra Members" list, and 7th in their "Marvel Comics: Ranking 10 Members Of Hydra From Weakest To Most Powerful" list.
 In 2022, Screen Rant included Viper in their "15 Best Wolverine Love Interests In Marvel Comics" list.
 In 2022, CBR.com ranked Viper 7th in their "10 Most Attractive Marvel Villains" list.

Other versions

Age of Apocalypse
In the Age of Apocalypse reality, Viper was married to the Silver Samurai. She and her husband fought their way from the islands of Japan through hordes of Apocalypse's Infinites. Viper was killed saving Samurai's life, leading to the Silver Samurai accepting Magneto's offer to join the X-Men.

Exiles
One of the alternate dimensions that is visited in Exiles #91-95 has been overtaken by a version of Madame Hydra. This world (Earth-1720) was dominated by Madame Hydra (actually Susan Storm Richards), her lover Wolverine, and their top assassin Slaymaster. However, before the Exiles can exact retribution, Madame Hydra and her lackeys escape into the omniverse to seek out other worlds to conquer.

Ultimate Marvel
The Ultimate Marvel version of Viper appears in Ultimatum: Spider-Man Requiem along with HYDRA. She attacks Tony Stark's offices in order to retrieve the Iron Man armor, but is subdued by Iron Man with the help of Spider-Man, and taken into custody by S.H.I.E.L.D.

In other media

Television 
 Viper / Madame Hydra appears in the X-Men: Evolution episode "Target X", voiced by Lisa Ann Beley. This version is the leader of HYDRA and is served by Gauntlet. She is apparently killed after her base is destroyed by X-23.
 Viper appears in The Avengers: Earth's Mightiest Heroes, voiced by Vanessa Marshall. While she does not make her first official appearance until the episode "Prisoner of War", a Skrull infiltrator disguised as Viper appears in the earlier episode "Widow's Sting", wherein they are captured by S.H.I.E.L.D. and their identity is exposed. In "Prisoner of War" and "Secret Invasion", the real Viper joins forces with Captain America and their fellow captives to escape from Skrull imprisonment and aid Earth's heroes in repelling a Skrull invasion. In "Along Came a Spider", Viper and King Cobra are captured by S.H.I.E.L.D., but are rescued by the Serpent Society and escape despite Captain America and Spider-Man's intervention.
 A variation of Ophelia / Madame Hydra appears in season four of Agents of S.H.I.E.L.D. as the Framework alias of the AI AIDA, portrayed by Mallory Jansen. Introduced in the episode "What If...?", she maintains the Framework, a virtual reality world of an alternate timeline ruled by HYDRA, and pursues a relationship with HYDRA's lead scientist the "Doctor", S.H.I.E.L.D. scientist Leo Fitz's Framework counterpart, to help her enact Project: Looking Glass, which will allow her to exist in the real world. Successfully enacting the project, Ophelia grants herself various powers, such as imperviousness to conventional forms of harm, and kidnaps Fitz. Taking advantage of her experiencing human emotions, he convinces Ophelia to rescue his teammates, though they are captured by Fitz's partner, Jemma Simmons. Learning Fitz loves Simmons instead of her, Ophelia escapes and joins forces with Anton Ivanov in the hopes of making S.H.I.E.L.D. suffer for the pain they caused her. As part of her plan, Ophelia attempts to retrieve the Darkhold, only to be stopped by Robbie Reyes, whose supernatural powers allow him to harm her. Using this, S.H.I.E.L.D. agent Phil Coulson borrows Reyes' powers to successfully destroy Ophelia.

Film
 "Viper" appears in Nick Fury: Agent of S.H.I.E.L.D. as the alias of Andrea von Strucker, portrayed by Sandra Hess.
 Viper appears in 20th Century Fox's The Wolverine, portrayed by Svetlana Khodchenkova. Due to rights issues with Marvel Studios at the time, this version is never referred to as "Madame Hydra" nor is her affiliation with the organization referenced. Instead, she is portrayed as a Mutant who is immune to all toxins on Earth, capable of shedding her skin if she is ever infected, can produce acidic saliva, and is a master of toxins. Additionally, she is a brilliant scientist who uses the alias Dr. Green. Ichiro Yashida hires Viper to help transfer Logan's healing factor to him as well as monitor Kenuichio Harada's ninja clan. Viper is later killed while fighting Yukio.

Video games
 Viper appears as the first boss of Marvel: Avengers Alliance.
 Viper appears as a boss in Marvel: Avengers Alliance Tactics.
 Viper / Madame Hydra appears in Marvel Heroes, voiced by Tasia Valenza.
 Viper appears in Lego Marvel Super Heroes, voiced by Kari Wahlgren.
 Viper appears in Lego Marvel's Avengers.
 Viper / Madame Hydra appears as a boss in Marvel Avengers Academy.
 Viper / Madame Hydra appears in Marvel Powers United VR, voiced again by Vanessa Marshall.
 Viper appears as a playable character in Marvel: Future Fight.

Miscellaneous
 Viper / Madame Hydra appears in the Spider-Woman: Agent of S.W.O.R.D. motion comic, voiced by Nicolette Reed.
 Viper / Madame Hydra appears in the Marvel Universe: LIVE! arena show.

Merchandise
An action figure of Viper was released in Hasbro's Marvel Legends line via the "Marvel's Madames" sub-line.

References

External links
 Viper (Madame Hydra) at Marvel.com
 Ophelia Sarkissian (Earth-616) at the Marvel Wiki
 Viper's Profile at The Women of Marvel Comics
 
 
 Values of a Viper at UncannyXmen.net

Captain America characters
Characters created by Jim Steranko
Comics characters introduced in 1969
Fictional blade and dart throwers
Fictional characters with slowed ageing
Fictional gangsters
Fictional Hungarian people
Fictional murderers
Hydra (comics) agents
Marvel Comics characters who can teleport
Marvel Comics female supervillains
Marvel Comics film characters
Marvel Comics martial artists
Marvel Comics orphans
Marvel Comics television characters
Villains in animated television series
Wolverine (comics) characters